WGDH (91.7 FM) is a non-commercial educational American radio station that serves the community of Hardwick, Vermont, United States and the surrounding areas of Lamoille, Washington and Caledonia counties.  The station, launched in 2011, is owned by Central Vermont Community Radio Corporation.

WGDH is a hybrid community/public radio station, broadcasting a freeform radio format, simulcasting with its sister station WGDR (91.1 FM) in nearby Plainfield, Vermont. The station began broadcasting on February 23, 2011, initially at half-power, or 550 watts, and was originally licensed to Goddard College Corporation. Full-power broadcasting at 1,100 watts began on March 7, 2011, six days after the Federal Communications Commission granted the station an operating license on March 1, replacing its original construction permit that was issued on April 9, 2008.  The station was assigned the call sign WGDH by the FCC on October 8, 2009.

A community party to celebrate the launch of the station was held on April 9, 2011, at The Hardwick Town House in Hardwick. The event was televised live by Hardwick Community Access Television.

Goddard College donated the licenses for WGDH and sister station WGDR to Central Vermont Community Radio Corporation effective May 10, 2021.

See also
List of community radio stations in the United States

References

External links

GDH
Community radio stations in the United States
Radio stations established in 2011
2011 establishments in Vermont
Goddard College